Jiang Zhenghua (born in October 1937) is a Chinese male politician, who served as the vice chairperson of the Standing Committee of the National People's Congress.

References 

1937 births
Possibly living people
Vice Chairpersons of the National People's Congress